David Michael Hogg (born 23 August 1946) is a Scottish former footballer, who played for Hibernian, Dundee United, Dumbarton, Berwick Rangers, Hamilton Academical and Alloa Athletic.

References

1946 births
Living people
Scottish footballers
Dumbarton F.C. players
Hibernian F.C. players
Dundee United F.C. players
Hamilton Academical F.C. players
Berwick Rangers F.C. players
Alloa Athletic F.C. players
Scottish Football League players
Footballers from Edinburgh
Association football forwards